Eri Hozumi and Miyu Kato were the defending champions, but Kato chose to compete at the 2018 J&T Banka Prague Open. Hozumi chose to partner Makoto Ninomiya but lost in the semifinals to Ksenia Lykina and Emily Webley-Smith.

Rika Fujiwara and Yuki Naito won the title, defeating Lykina and Webley-Smith in the final, 7–5, 6–4.

Seeds

Draw

Draw

References
Main Draw

Kangaroo Cup - Doubles
Kangaroo Cup
2018 in Japanese tennis